Adeloceras is a genus of Mississippian to Lower Permian nautiloid cephalopods included in the nautilid superfamily Aipocerataceae along with genera like Aipoceras, Asymptoceras, and Solenochilus.

References

 The Paleobiology  Database Aipocerataceae entry
 List of cephalopod genera, J.J. Sepkoski. 

Prehistoric nautiloid genera
Mississippian first appearances
Cisuralian genus extinctions